Tourbillon (1928–1954) was a French Thoroughbred racehorse and Champion sire.

Background
Tourbillon was bred and raced by one of France's most prominent horsemen, Marcel Boussac. Tourbillon was sired by Ksar, a back-to-back winner of the Prix de l'Arc de Triomphe and Leading sire in France in 1931 whose own sire, Bruleur, won the 1913 Grand Prix de Paris and was the Leading sire in France in 1921, 1924, and 1929. Tourbillon's dam, Durban, was an outstanding runner who won several top races in France which are now Group One events. Damsire, Durbar won England's Epsom Derby in 1914.

Racing career
Tourbillon was a winner of the Prix du Jockey Club at three, and the Prix Lupin at age three.

Stud career
Tourbillon became the foundation stallion for Marcel Boussac's  Haras de Fresnay-le-Buffard at Neuvy-au-Houlme in Lower Normandy. A sire of sires, Tourbillon was the Leading sire in France in 1940, 1942, 1945. Among his progeny were:
 Goya (1934) – Gimcrack Stakes, St. James's Palace Stakes, Prix Boiard, two-time Leading sire in France 
 Djebel (1937) – 2,000 Guineas Stakes, Prix de l'Arc de Triomphe, two-time Leading sire in France
 Coaraze (b. 1942) -Prix du Jockey Club, Grand Prix de Saint-Cloud, Prix d'Ispahan (2×)
 Caracalla (1942) – Grand Prix de Paris, Prix Royal Oak, Ascot Gold Cup, Prix de l'Arc de Triomphe
 Ambiorix (1946) –  Grand Critérium, Prix Lupin

Some of Tourbillon's offspring, particularly through his  grandson, My Babu, were successful competitors in show jumping, dressage, and three-day event disciplines.

Pedigree

References
 Tourbillon's pedigree and partial racing stats
 Tourbillon's full prifile at Thoroughbred Heritage

1928 racehorse births
1954 racehorse deaths
Racehorses bred in France
Racehorses trained in France
Champion Thoroughbred Sires of France
Thoroughbred family 13-c
Byerley Turk sire line
Chefs-de-Race